Wolf of New York is a 1940 American crime film directed by William C. McGann and written by Gordon Kahn and Lionel Houser. The film stars Edmund Lowe, Rose Hobart, James Stephenson, Jerome Cowan, William Demarest and Maurice Murphy. The film was released on January 23, 1940, by Republic Pictures.

Plot

Cast
Edmund Lowe as Chris Faulkner
Rose Hobart as Peggy Nolan
James Stephenson as Hiram Rogers
Jerome Cowan as Cosgrave
William Demarest as Bill Ennis
Maurice Murphy as Frankie Mason
Charles D. Brown as Const. Nolan
Edward Gargan as W. Thornton Upshaw
Andrew Tombes as Sylvester Duncan
Ben Welden as Owney McGill
Ann Baldwin as Gladys
Roy Gordon as Governor

References

External links
 

1940 films
American crime films
1940 crime films
Republic Pictures films
Films directed by William C. McGann
Films scored by William Lava
American black-and-white films
1940s English-language films
1940s American films